The statistical regions of Slovenia are 12 administrative entities created in 2000 for legal and statistical purposes.

Division
By a decree in 2000, Slovenia has been divided into 12 statistical regions (NUTS-3 level), which are grouped in two cohesion regions (NUTS-2 level). which replace the historical regions of the country.

The statistical regions have been grouped into two cohesion regions are:
Eastern Slovenia (Vzhodna Slovenija – SI01), which groups the Mura, Drava, Carinthia, Savinja, Central Sava, Lower Sava, Southeast Slovenia, and Littoral–Inner Carniola regions.
Western Slovenia (Zahodna Slovenija – SI02), which groups the Central Slovenia, Upper Carniola, Gorizia, and Coastal–Karst regions.

Sources 
 Slovenian regions in figures 2014

See also
List of Slovenian regions by Human Development Index
Municipalities of Slovenia
Traditional regions of Slovenia

References

External links

 Regions. Stat.si (accessed 15 December 2020).
 Map of statistical regions of Slovenia. Geopedia.si (accessed 15 December 2020).

 
Regions of Slovenia